"Collide" is a song by American singer Howie Day. The song was written by Day and Better Than Ezra frontman Kevin Griffin, and the London Session Orchestra provided backing instrumentation on the initial album version of the song. "Collide" was released in the United States on June 1, 2004, as the second single from Day's second full-length album, Stop All the World Now (2003), and reached number 20 on the Billboard Hot 100 a year after its release, in June 2005.

Background and content
Howie Day collaborated with Griffin while writing this song. The song's lyrics are rooted in a relationship, with notes of the occasional adversity the two people involved may face.

Commercial performance
The popularity of "Collide" built slowly on U.S. radio, at first gaining the greatest success on Billboards Adult Top 40 chart.  Chart performance benefitted significantly from a reissue of Stop All the World Now in a special edition that included four bonus tracks, one being an acoustic version of the song that reached number 20 on the Billboard Hot 100 chart.

Music video
The music video was filmed in Toronto, Canada. The video features Day singing on the subway while recalling happy memories with his partner, interspersed with clips of Day playing guitar beneath a bridge.

Track listingUS and Australian promo CD'''
 "Collide" (Chris Lord-Alge radio edit) – 4:07
 "Collide" (original album version) – 4:09

Charts

Weekly charts

Year-end charts

Certifications

Release history

Cover versions
In 2011, reggae singer Singing Melody covered the song on his album titled They Call Me Mr. Melody on the VP Records label. Singing Melody's cover of the song became number one on 4 international reggae charts.  The album also reached number six on the Billboard Reggae Chart.

Daniel Evans, a finalist on The X Factor (UK), produced a country/pop cover on his YouTube channel in 2013 and was subsequently released on iTunes as track 3 of his self-produced Reflections EP.

In 2015, Sarah Charley, US communications manager for the Large Hadron Collider experiments at CERN with graduate students Jesse Heilman of the University of California, Riverside, and Tom Perry and Laser Seymour Kaplan of the University of Wisconsin, Madison created a parody video sung from the perspective of a proton in the Large Hadron Collider.

In popular culture

"Collide" has since been used in promotion of various television series, including: What About Brian, Friday Night Lights, General Hospital, as well as the 2005 film adaptation of Pride & Prejudice, and the 2005 film The Perfect Man.

This song has also been featured during episodes of Laguna Beach: The Real Orange County, Ghost Whisperer, Scrubs, ER, Bones, Third Watch, Cold Case, One Tree Hill, Grey's Anatomy, Summerland and Joan of Arcadia. On General Hospital this was the song to which popular pairing Patrick and Robin, known as "Scrubs", first made on Memorial Day in 2006.

It was used as the theme song to the short-lived 2005 teen drama Palmetto Pointe.

The song was featured in Season 7 of So You Think You Can Dance, featuring Kent Boyd and Lauren Froderman.

The song was also used recently in the 2016 Christian drama film Miracles From Heaven.

In 2015, after the US communications officer and three graduate students at the European Organization for Nuclear Research (CERN) shared a parody video of "Collide", Day made a new version of the song in a video during a visit to CERN. The lyrics were changed to the perspective of a proton in the Large Hadron Collider.

In 2021, in the Hallmark film Eight Gifts of Hanukkah''.

In 2005, the song was used in ABC's closing montage for the 2005 NBA Finals after the San Antonio Spurs won their 3rd NBA title.

References

2000s ballads
2004 singles
2004 songs
American folk songs
American soft rock songs
Epic Records singles
Howie Day songs
Rock ballads
Songs containing the I–V-vi-IV progression
Songs written by Kevin Griffin